Hans Reiss Ph.D. (19 August 1922 – 2 April 2020) was Professor Emeritus of German at the University of Bristol.

Life 
Reiss was born in Mannheim, Germany. The son of a Jewish printer, Berthold Reiss, and the actress Maria Reiss-Petri (who performed for the National Theatre Mannheim), he fled  Nazi Germany to Ireland a week before World War II broke out in 1939. He completed his education in Ireland and was awarded a scholarship to study at Trinity College Dublin in 1940. He received his Bachelor of Arts in 1943 and Ph.D. in German from TCD in 1945, where he was assistant to the Professor of German, M.F. Liddle, from 1943 to 1946.

From 1946 to 1953 he was lecturer at the London School of Economics. From 1953 to 1958 he lectured at Queen Mary, University of London (then Queen Mary College). In 1958 he was appointed Professor and Head of the Department of German Studies at McGill University, Montreal. From 1965 until his retirement in 1988 he was Professor and Head of the German Department at the University of Bristol. Thereafter he held a number of guest professorships, and was Senior Research Fellow at the University of Bristol from 1995 until 2009.

He was married to the artist Linda Reiss from 1963 until his death; they had two children. In 2009 they moved to Heidelberg in Germany. He died in 2020 in Heidelberg.

Work 
Hans Reiss's research was focussed on Goethe and 20th-century German literature, as well as German political thought around 1800. He achieved international recognition with his publication of Kant's Political Writings in 1970. His book publications include:

 Franz Kafka (1952; 1956).
 The Political Thought of the German Romantics (1793-1815) (1955).
 Goethes Romane (1963).
 Das Politische Denken in der Deutschen Romantik (1966).
Translated into Chinese in 2013.
 Goethe's Novels (1969; 1971), .
 Kants Politisches Denken (1977), . Translated into Japanese in 1989.
 The Writer’s Task from Nietzsche to Brecht (1978), .
 Formgestaltung und Politik, Goethe-Studien (1993), .
 Erinnerungen aus 85 Jahren (2009), .

Since 1974 Reiss edited British and Irish Studies in German Language and Literature, initially with Idris Parry, then as sole editor, and from 1988 with W.E. Yates. The series closed in 2015.

Awards 
 1972: Goethe's Novels was voted "Outstanding Book of the Year 1972" by the American Association of College and Research Libraries
 1988: Order of Merit of the Federal Republic of Germany 1st Class
 1997: Goethe Medal in Gold of the Goethe-Gesellschaft Weimar
 2011: Life Member of the Modern Humanities Research Association (MHRA)
 Since 1981 he has been a member of the Freie Akademie der Künste Rhein-Neckar (previously known as the Freie Akademie der Künste Mannheim) in Mannheim.

External links 
 
British and Irish Studies in German Language and Literature
Modern Humanities Research Association home page
Home page of the Freie Akademie Rhein-Neckar (German)
Obituary by Gustav Seibt (German)

Academics of the London School of Economics
Academic staff of McGill University
Academics of the University of Bristol
Officers Crosses of the Order of Merit of the Federal Republic of Germany
Germanists
Jewish emigrants from Nazi Germany
Writers from Mannheim
Naturalised citizens of Ireland
1922 births
2020 deaths
German emigrants to Ireland
Irish expatriates in the United Kingdom